Robert William Dean (May 25, 1920 – September 10, 2014) was an American diplomat.

Born in Hinsdale, Illinois, Dean went to Morton High School. During World War II, Dean served in the United States Navy. He received a master's degree in international relations from University of Chicago. He served in the United States Foreign Service and lived in Brazil, Chile, Mexico. He served as United States Ambassador to Peru from 1974 to 1977. In 1978, Dean retired from the United States Foreign Service and lived in Dallas, Texas. He worked for the Dallas Chamber of Commerce and owned an international consulting business. Dean died in Dallas, Texas.

Notes

External links

1920 births
2014 deaths
People from Hinsdale, Illinois
People from Dallas
University of Chicago alumni
Ambassadors of the United States to Peru
Businesspeople from Texas
United States Foreign Service personnel
20th-century American businesspeople
United States Navy personnel of World War II